The 1978 Buffalo Bills season was the franchise's 9th season in the National Football League, and the 19th overall. The Bills were coming off a season in which they only won three games, making 1978 a slight improvement.

Head coach Chuck Knox began his first season with the team, having coached the Los Angeles Rams for the previous five seasons. It was also Buffalo's first season after the departure of star running back O. J. Simpson, who was traded to San Francisco for five draft picks in the offseason.

The Bills offense acquired a pair of weapons for quarterback Joe Ferguson: wide receiver Frank Lewis, who had spent the previous 7 seasons in Pittsburgh, and rookie running back Terry Miller, who ended the season with over 1,000 yards.

The 1978 Bills' run defense allowed an NFL record 3,228 rushing yards; the 677 rushing attempts the Bills faced in 1978 is also an NFL record. Oddly, the Bills were first in the league in yards allowed on pass defense, giving up only 1,960 yards through the air.

Offseason

Draft

Personnel

Staff/coaches

Roster

Regular season

Schedule 

Note: Intra-division opponents are in bold text.

Season summary

Week 1

Week 4

Week 5

Week 13 vs. Giants

Week 14 at Chiefs

Standings

Player stats

Passing 
Note: Comp = Completions; ATT = Attempts; TD = Touchdowns; INT = Interceptions

Special teams 
Note: FGA = Field Goals Attempted; FGM = Field Goals Made; FG% = Field goal percentage; XPA = Extra Points Attempted; XPM = Extra Points Made; XP% = Extra Points Percentage

Video Archives 
 1978 NFL Week 1: Pittsburgh Steelers at Buffalo Bills at YouTube
 1978 NFL Week 2: New York Jets at Buffalo Bills at YouTube
 1978 NFL Week 5: Kansas City Chiefs at Buffalo Bills at YouTube
 1978 NFL Week 6: Buffalo Bills at New York Jets at YouTube

Notes

External links 
 Pro-Football-Reference.com: 1978 Buffalo Bills

References 

 Bills on Pro Football Reference
 Bills on jt-sw.com
 Bills Stats on jt-sw.com

Buffalo Bills seasons
Buffalo Bills
Buffalo